Hindustan Ki Kasam is a 1973 war movie based on Operation Cactus Lilly in the Indo-Pakistani War of 1971 directed by Chetan Anand, who has previously made the popular war film Haqeeqat (1964) on the Sino-Indian War, the film however didn't perform well commercially.

Synopsis 

The movie is different from other war movies in Indian cinema as it vividly describes the IAF's role in the 1971 Indo-Pakistani war in the western sector.

The film starts with an air raid by Pakistan Air Force (PAF) on an Indian Air Force (IAF) airbase in the western sector in India. After the raid, a pilot (Raaj Kumar) takes an oath while standing near the body of a dead ground crewman - "Jawaab dene aaunga, is jawan ki kasam, Hindustan Ki Kasam" (I will avenge, I swear by this soldier, I swear by Hindustan). The credits start while the title song of the movie is played in the background (sung by the Mohammed Rafi and Manna Dey).

The movie revolves around the IAF's mission of destroying a PAF radar, which blocks IAF pilot's radios in combat. Indian intelligence plant Mohini, who is Tahira's (Priya Rajvansh) look alike, fiancée of a PAF pilot (Amjad Khan). Mohini goes to Pakistan and starts working as a singer on Pakistan TV (PTV) studio (where the radar which jams the radio frequency of IAF jets is also kept). Mohini informs the IAF about the jammer. IAF asks her to leave the building in the night after her programme is done so that they can raid the building.

PAF's counter intelligence learns about her, and they zero in on her on that very night. As soon her programme is finished, the IAF air raids the studio while she is still inside. In the dogfight with Pak sabers, Raaj Kumar's jet is destroyed, and he crashes. He radios for help, and the IAF fighters destroy the pursuing Pakistani soldiers and their vehicles. The pilot and Tahira are evacuated. The movie ends with IAF's flyby on the Republic day parade in New Delhi with the title song in the background.

Cast
Chetan Anand
Vijay Anand
Raaj Kumar
Priya Rajvansh as Mohini
Balraj Sahni
Padma Khanna
Amjad Khan
Amrish Puri
Parikshat Sahni as Rajesh
Bharat Kapoor as Usmaan
Nitin Sethi
Satyen Kappu

Music
"Har Taraf Ab Yehi Afsane Hai, Ham Teri Aankho Ke Diwane Hai" - Manna Dey
"Hai Tere Saath Meri Wafa" - Lata Mangeshkar
"Hindustaan Ki Qasam, Hindstaan Ki Qasam" - Manna Dey, Mohammed Rafi
"Duniya Banane Wale Yahi Hai Meri Iltaja Ki Ho Na Kabhi Apne Juda" - Lata Mangeshkar

References

External links

1973 films
1970s Hindi-language films
Indian action war films
Indian aviation films
Films directed by Chetan Anand
Films scored by Madan Mohan
Films based on Indo-Pakistani wars and conflicts
War films based on actual events
Indian Air Force in films
Military of Pakistan in films
Indian historical action films